Paradise Valley Hospital may refer to:

 Paradise Valley Hospital (Arizona)
 Paradise Valley Hospital (California)